The Tudor navy was the navy of the Kingdom of England under the ruling Tudor dynasty (1485–1603). The period involved important and critical changes that led to the establishment of a permanent navy and laid the foundations for the future Royal Navy.

Henry VII
Henry VII fostered sea power. He supported the old 1381 act that stated "that, to increase the navy of England, no goods or merchandises shall be either exported or imported, but only in ships belonging to the King's subjects." Although there is no evidence for a conscious change of policy, Henry soon embarked on a program of building merchant ships larger than previously. He also invested in dockyards, and commissioned the oldest surviving dry dock in 1495 at Portsmouth, with the Sweepstake and the Mary Fortune being the first ships built there.

With the crown he acquired the Grace à Dieu, the Governor, the Martin Garcia, the Mary of the Tower, the Trinity, the Falcon, and possibly the Bonaventure. He purchased the Carvel of Ewe (Caravel of Eu, in Normandy), and perhaps also a small craft called the King's Bark; he captured the Margaret in 1490; and he built the Regent, the Sovereign, the Sweepstake (Constructed, partly out of the remains of the broken-up Grace à Dieu, under the superintendence of Sir Reginald Bray, and, in all likelihood, was launched in 1488.), and the Mary Fortune (Later rebuilt as the Sparrow).

Henry VIII

Biographer Jack Scarisbrick says that Henry VIII (reigned 1509–1547) deserved his traditional title of "Father of the English navy". He inherited seven small warships from his father, and added two dozen more by 1514.  In addition to those built in England, he bought up Italian and Hanseatic warships. By March 1513, he proudly watched his fleet sail down the Thames under command of Sir Edmund Howard. It was the most powerful naval force to date in English history: 24 ships led by the 1600 ton "Henry Imperial"; the fleet carried 5000 combat marines and 3000 sailors.  It forced the outnumbered French fleet back to its ports, took control of the English Channel, and blockaded Brest.  Henry was the first king to organize the navy as a permanent force, with a permanent administrative and logistical structure, funded by tax revenue and supervised by the new Navy Board. His personal attention was concentrated on land, where he founded the royal dockyards, planted trees for shipbuilding, enacted laws for inland navigation, guarded the coastline with fortifications, set up a school for navigation and designated the roles of officers and sailors.  He closely supervised the construction of all his warships and their guns, knowing their designs, speed, tonnage, armaments and battle tactics. He encouraged his naval architects, who perfected the Italian technique of mounting guns in the waist of the ship, thus lowering the center of gravity and making it a better platform. He supervised the smallest details and enjoyed nothing more than presiding over the launching of a new ship. He drained his treasury on military and naval affairs, diverting the revenues from new taxes and the sales of monastery lands as well as taking out foreign loans and debasing the English currency.

In 1512 Sir Edward Howard took over as Lord Admiral, and attacked on 10 August at Pointe Saint-Mathieu, with inconclusive results despite a memorable slugging match between the English Regent and the French Cordelière resulting in the destruction of both. Additional combat in 1513 resulted in the death of Sir Edward, and his brother Thomas Howard took his place. In 1514 the 1,500-ton carrack Henry Grace à Dieu was launched, the first English two-decker and one of the earliest warships equipped with gunports and heavy bronze cannons. Henry also commissioned the Anthony Roll (now in the Pepys Library), a survey of his navy as it was around 1546, from which comes much of the pictorial evidence for his ships.

Henry VIII was threatened by the Pope's excommunication proceedings in 1538 and the peace between France and the Holy Roman Empire, which would allow them to unite against a heretical England. The projected force fo the navy, which had been reinforced by 40 men-at-war at this point in his reign, would be needed to protect England from invasion until the threat of invasion passed in 1541 when France and the Holy Roman Empire renewed hostilities.

Henry VIII initiated the casting of cannon in England. By the late Elizabethan age (see the Aldernay wreck survey) English iron workers using blast furnaces developed the technique of producing cast iron cannons which, while not as durable as the prevailing bronze cannons, they were much cheaper and enabled England to arm its navy more easily.

In the end, the chief result of the war with France was a decision to keep the 30 ships active during peacetime. This entailed the establishment of a number of shore facilities, and the hiring of additional administrators; a royal shipwright appears in 1538. By 1540 the navy consisted of 45 ships, a fleet of 20 ships were sent to Scotland in 1544 to land troops to burn Edinburgh, and in 1545 Lord Lisle had a force of 80 ships fighting a French force of 130 attempting to invade England in conjunction with the Battle of the Solent (where the Mary Rose sank). In the same year a memorandum established a "king's majesty's council of his marine", a first formal organization comprising seven officers, each in charge of a specific area, presided over by "Lieutenant of the Admiralty" or Vice-Admiral Thomas Clere. When war was not at hand the Navy was mostly occupied in chasing pirates.

Historian G.R. Elton argues that Henry indeed build up the organization and infrastructure of the Navy, but it was not a useful weapon for his style of warfare. It lacked a useful strategy. It did serve for defense against invasion, and for enhancing England's international prestige.

Edward and Mary
Edward VI and Mary I added little new to their father's navy.  Although the navy was involved in the maneuverings following the death of Henry VIII, it was ineffective. Mary maintained the building program, the navy performed satisfactorily if not outstandingly (it did not prevent the loss of Calais) in the war with France of 1557 to 1559. However, the marriage of Mary I and Philip II led to trade with Spain, allowing English shipwrights to examine and adapt modern Spanish galleon design to the needs of the English Navy as English ports were soon visited by both Spanish warships and merchantmen. This would later prove crucial to the growth and development of the race-built galleon and the Elizabethan Navy that would obtain some triumphs against the Spanish Armada during the war between Protestant England and Catholic Spain.

Elizabeth I
While Henry VIII had launched the Royal Navy, his successors King Edward VI and Queen Mary I had ignored it and it was little more than a system of coastal defense. Elizabeth made naval strength a high priority. She risked war with Spain by supporting the "Sea Dogs," such as John Hawkins and Francis Drake, who preyed on the Spanish merchant ships carrying gold and silver from the New World.

A fleet review on Elizabeth I's accession in 1559 showed the navy to consist of 39 ships, and there were plans to build another 30, to be grouped into five categories (a foreshadowing of the rating system). Elizabeth kept the navy at a constant expenditure for the next 20 years, and maintained a steady construction rate.

By the 1580s, tensions with Spain had reached the breaking point, exacerbated by Elizabeth's support for the privateering expeditions of Hawkins, Drake, and others, and capped by the Cadiz raid of 1587, in which Drake destroyed dozens of Spanish ships.  In 1588, Philip II of Spain launched the Spanish Armada against England, but after a running battle lasting over a week, the Armada was scattered and limped home. These famous battles were early actions in the long and costly Anglo-Spanish War of 1585–1604.

Technological advances
The Navy yards were leaders in technical innovation, and the captains devised new tactics.  Parker (1996) argues that the full-rigged ship was one of the greatest technological advances of the century and permanently transformed naval warfare. In 1573 English shipwrights introduced designs, first demonstrated in the Dreadnought, that allowed the ships to sail faster and maneuver better and permitted heavier guns. Whereas before warships had tried to grapple with each other so that soldiers could board the enemy ship, now they stood off and fired broadsides that would sink the enemy vessel. When Spain finally decided to invade and conquer England it was a fiasco; Hawkins and Drake's designs of English warships made them longer, faster, more maneuverable, and more heavily gunned than its Spanish counterpart. Superior English ships and seamanship foiled the invasion and led to the destruction of the Spanish Armada in 1588, marking the high point of Elizabeth's reign.  Technically, the Armada failed because Spain's over-complex strategy required coordination between the invasion fleet and the Spanish army on shore.  But the poor design of the Spanish cannons meant they were much slower in reloading in a close-range battle, allowing the English to take control. Spain and France still had stronger fleets, but England was catching up.

Structure of the Tudor Navy

Key officials from 1485 to 1546
Officers from 1485 to 1546 included: 
Admiral of England, Ireland and Aquitaine
 John de Vere, 13th Earl of Oxford, 1485-1512
 Sir Edward Howard, 1512-1513
 Thomas Howard, 3rd Duke of Norfolk, 1513-1525
 Henry FitzRoy, 1st Duke of Richmond and Somerset, 1525-1536
 William Fitzwilliam, 1st Earl of Southampton, 1536-1540
 John Russell, 1st Lord Russell, 1540-1542
 John Dudley, 1st Viscount Lisle, 1542-1546

Clerk of Marine Causes
 Thomas Rogers, 12 December 1480 d.1488
 William Commersall, 1488-18 May 1495
 Robert Brygandine, 19 May 1495 – 1523
 Thomas Jermyn, and William Gonson, 1523–1533, (jointly)
 Leonard Thoreton 1533-1538
 Vice-Admiral Sir Thomas Spert, 1538-1543
 Edmund Wynter, 1544-1545
 John Wynter 1545- d. 1546

Clerk Comptroller of the Navy
 John Hopton, 1512-1524
 Vice-Admiral, Sir Thomas Spert, 1524-1540
 John Osborne, 1540-1545
 William Broke, 1545-1561

Keeper of the Storehouses
 Vice-Admiral, Sir William Gonson, 1524-1545
 Richard Howlett, 1545-1546

Key officials from 1546 to 1603
Officers from 1546 to 1603
Lord High Admirals of England
 Thomas Seymour, 1st Lord Seymour of Sudeley, 1546-1549
 John Dudley, 1st Earl of Warwick, 1549-1550
 Edward Clinton, 9th Lord Clinton, 1550-1554
 William Howard, 1st Lord Howard of Effingham, 1554-1558
 Edward Clinton, 1st Earl of Lincoln, 1558-1585
 Charles Howard, 1st Earl of Nottingham, 1585-1603

In 1546 Henry VIII establishes a Council of the Marine to oversee the administrative affairs of the Navy initially presided over by the Lieutenant of the Admiralty reporting to the Lord High Admiral.

Lieutenants of the Admiralty
 Sir Thomas Clere 1545-1552
 Sir William Woodhouse 1552-1565

Note:(post is vacant till 1604)

Treasurers of Marine Causes
 Sir Robert Legge, 1546-1549
 Benjamin Gonson, 1549-1547
 Benjamin Gonson and Sir John Hawkins, 1549-1577
 Sir John Hawkins, 1577-1595
 Sir Roger Longford, 1595-1598
 Sir Fulke Greville, 1st Baron Brooke, 1595-1603

Surveyors and Riggers of the Navy
 Benjamin Gonson 24 April 1546
 Vice-Admiral, Sir Thomas Spert, 1524-1540
 Vice Admiral Sir William Wynter 8 July 1549 (also Master of Naval Ordnance)
 Sir Henry Palmer 11 July 1589.
 Sir John Trevor 20 December 1598 -1603.

Masters of Naval Ordnance
 Vice-Admiral Sir William Woodhouse, 1546-1552
 Vice Admiral Sir Thomas Wyndham, 1552-1553
 Vice Admiral Sir William Wynter 1557-1589 (also Surveyor)

Note:Office is discontinued after 1589.

Comptrollers of the Navy
 William Broke, 1545-1561
 Vice-Admiral, William Holstocke, 1561–1580
 William Borough, 1580–1598
 Sir Henry Palmer 1598–1603

Keepers of the Storehouses
 Richard Howlett, 1546-1548
 William Holstock, 1548-1560
Note: (office is merged with Treasurer of the Navy)

Surveyors of Marine Victuals
 Edward Baeshe, 1550-1587
 James Quarles, 1587-1595
 Sir Marmaduke Darrell, 1595-1603

Clerk of the Navy (also known as Clerk of the Ships)
 Richard Howlett, 24 April 1546- 10 October 1560.
 George Wynter, 10 October 1560 – 2 June 1567.
 John Hawkins, 2 June 1567, (appointed but did not succeed).
 George Wynter, 2 June 1567 – 24 March 1582.
 William B. B. Gonson, 24 March 1582 – 6 July 1596.
 Benjamin Gonson, 6 July 1596 – 17 April 1603.

Legacy
Important though this period was, it represents a soon-lost high point. After 1601 the efficiency of the Navy declined gradually, and corruption grew, until it was brought under control by an inquiry of 1618.

See also
 Admiralty in the 16th century
 History of the Royal Navy: 1500-1601
 Navy Board
 William Winter (admiral)

References

Further reading
 Corbett, Julian S. Drake and the Tudor Navy, With a History of the Rise of England as a Maritime Power (2 vol 1898) online
 Glasgow, Tom. "Vice Admiral Woodhouse and ship keeping the Tudor navy," Mariner's Mirror, 63 (1977), pp 253–63
 Konstam, Angus, Sovereigns of the Sea: The Quest to Build the Perfect Renaissance Battleship Wiley. 2008.  
 Loades, David, The Tudor Navy: An administrative, political and military history. Scolar Press, Aldershot. 1992. 
 Loades, David. The Making of the Elizabethan Navy, 1540-1590: From the Solent to the Armada (2009)
 Nelson, Arthur. The Tudor navy: the ships, men and organisation, 1485–1603 (2001)
 Parker, Geoffrey. "The dreadnought revolution of Tudor England." The Mariner's Mirror 82.3 (1996): 269–300.
 Rodger, Nicholas A. M., The Safeguard of the Sea: A Naval History of Britain 660–1649. W.W. Norton & Company, New York. 1997. 
 Rodger, Nicholas A. M., "The Development of Broadside Gunnery, 1450–1650." Mariner's Mirror 82 (1996), pp. 301–24.

Primary sources
 Knighton, C. S. and David Loades, eds. The navy of Edward VI and Mary I (2011) 652pp of original documents

History of the Royal Navy
Maritime history of England
Navy